Eustiromastix is a genus of jumping spiders that was first described by Eugène Louis Simon in 1902.

Species
 it contains fourteen species, found in South America, on Saint Vincent and the Grenadines, Trinidad and Tobago, and in Panama:
Eustiromastix bahiensis Galiano, 1979 – Brazil
Eustiromastix efferatus Bauab & Soares, 1978 – Brazil
Eustiromastix falcatus Galiano, 1981 – Trinidad, French Guiana, Brazil
Eustiromastix frontalis (Banks, 1929) – Panama
Eustiromastix guianae Caporiacco, 1954 – French Guiana
Eustiromastix intermedius Galiano, 1979 – Venezuela
Eustiromastix keyserlingi (Taczanowski, 1878) – Peru
Eustiromastix macropalpus Galiano, 1979 – Brazil
Eustiromastix major Simon, 1902 – French Guiana, Brazil
Eustiromastix moraballi Mello-Leitão, 1940 – Venezuela, Guyana
Eustiromastix nativo Santos & Romero, 2004 – Brazil
Eustiromastix obscurus (Peckham & Peckham, 1894) (type) – St. Vincent
Eustiromastix spinipes (Taczanowski, 1871) – Peru to Guyana
Eustiromastix vincenti (Peckham & Peckham, 1894) – St. Vincent

References

External links 
 Photographs of Eustiromastix species from Brazil

Salticidae
Salticidae genera
Spiders of South America
Spiders of the Caribbean